Han Xiaopeng (born December 13, 1983 in Pei, Xuzhou, Jiangsu, China) is a freestyle skier who competed at the 2006 Winter Olympics in Turin, Italy, and won gold in the men's aerials event. In this discipline he also won the World Championships in 2007. Despite these great achievements, he has yet to win a World Cup competition. Han is the first Chinese male athlete to ever win a gold medal at the Winter Olympics.

References

 FIS Bio

External links 
 
 
 
 

1983 births
Living people
Freestyle skiers at the 2002 Winter Olympics
Freestyle skiers at the 2006 Winter Olympics
Freestyle skiers at the 2010 Winter Olympics
Sportspeople from Xuzhou
Chinese male freestyle skiers
Olympic freestyle skiers of China
Olympic gold medalists for China
Olympic medalists in freestyle skiing
Medalists at the 2006 Winter Olympics
Asian Games medalists in freestyle skiing
Freestyle skiers at the 2007 Asian Winter Games
Asian Games gold medalists for China
Medalists at the 2007 Asian Winter Games
Skiers from Jiangsu